Grief & Distance is an EP by Sevendust's guitarist Clint Lowery, which was released on June 12, 2020, through Rise Records.

Writing and production
Clint Lowery began working on the EP after a tour with Alter Bridge, in early 2020. He recorded five songs at Sawhorse Studios in St. Louis, Missouri. The EP features three new songs, plus acoustic versions of "What's The Matter" and "Kings", which were previously released on God Bless the Renegades.

He dedicated this album to his mother who died in March 2020. Lowery says, "This EP was my way to process the loss of my mother, and the hard hit and the uncertainty of my livelihood from the pandemic." He continues, "I escaped into my basement and into the songwriting process…it never fails me."

Track listing

Personnel
 Clint Lowery – Vocals, Guitar, Bass, Drums, producer
 Brian Vodinh – Programming
 Jason McEntire – Engineering

External links
Official Clint Lowery Website

References

2020 EPs
Clint Lowery albums
Hard rock EPs